Tintal  is a neighbourhood (barrio) of Bogotá, Colombia. 

Neighbourhoods of Bogotá